Walter Bitterlich (February 19, 1908 – February 9, 2008) was an Austrian forestry scientist. He was the inventor of the relascope, a method for efficient forest inventory.

Early career 
Bitterlich descended from several generations of foresters and did much of his early work in the Tyrolean Alps of Austria.

Walter Bitterlich was the son of the forester Ernst Bitterlich and his wife Maria née Wachtel. Despite his upbringing in relative poverty, he successfully completed a forestry degree at Vienna's University of Natural Resources and Life Sciences in 1930 and the state exam for Higher Forest Service in 1933. Failing to find regular employment, he started volunteering with the Austrian State Forestry Commission.

National Socialism
Bitterlich was an early member of the National Socialist German Workers' Party, joining in 1933 when it was illegal to do so in Austria. After the Anschluss of Austria in 1939 he became party member no. 511,075  (later changed to 1,618,531). Despite failing to pay party dues for several years, he was recognised as an illegal, or early, national socialist on the recommendation of his local chapter, which vouched for his deep commitment to the ideas of fascism. This was essential for gaining employment with the national forest service, where, in 1937, three of every four employees held that distinction. Thus qualified, he was made forest inspector of his native district of Reutte in 1938, 30 years after his father held the same position. 
In 1942 he was drafted into military service, first at the Eastern Front and, starting in 1943, Normandy. His war memoirs, published in 2003, describe the sense of adventure and camaraderie he found during this time and his insights into the application of military thinking to forest trees. They do not mention the party he eagerly joined a decade before.

After the war, the Nationalsozialistengesetz required his dismissal from public service. Unemployed and short on cash, he brought his young family to Salzburg, where they moved in with his parents.
His fate soon turned, however, as Austria started to redefine its role as a victim, not perpetrator, of Nazi aggression. The 1947 changes to the law removed early party membership as a decisive factor in denazification and created a category of "minor offenders" that allowed many party members to resume their careers with little resistance. Thus, Bitterlich was reinstated in 1948, serving in Zell am See, and, from 1953 to 1967, Hallein.

Scientific Career
Beginning in 1948, Bitterlich developed a method of plotless sampling for forest inventory. His process was first published in 1948 and presented at the World Forestry Congress in Helsinki the following year. Also in 1949, he was awarded a doctoral degree by the University of Natural Resources. In 1967, he returned to his alma mater as full professor.

From 1949, he worked on commercialising his method with industry partners. From 1962, his company Feinmechanische Optische Gesellschaft developed and sold the relascope and other optical instruments with applications in forestry and the military.

With his wife Ilse, Bitterlich had four children. He died in his native Reutte on February 9, 2008, 10 days short of his centennial.

Honours and awards
 Honorary citizen of Nashville, Tennessee 
 Corresponding member of the Finnish Forest Research Institute
 Honorary Member of the Society of American Foresters (1971)
 Golden insignia of the Land of Salzburg
 Cross of Honour for Science and Art, 1st class (1983)
 Golden Medal of Reutte

A permanent exhibition at the Forest Discovery Centre in Füssen, Germany, shows a selection of his personal affects.

References 

1908 births
2008 deaths
People from Reutte District
20th-century Austrian people
Forestry researchers
Austrian foresters
Recipients of the Austrian Cross of Honour for Science and Art, 1st class
Forestry in Austria
Nazi Party members